The 2nd constituency of Essonne is a French legislative constituency in the Essonne département. It elects one Member of Parliament to the National Assembly of France.

Description

The 2nd constituency of Essonne is the largest by area in department and covers its rural south and east portions.

The seat  consistently elected Gaullist candidates from its creation in 1967 to 2022, with the sole exception of between 1981 and 1986. There has, however, been substantial boundary changes since then so the results are not strictly comparable. In both 1993 and 1997 the opposition to the mainstream conservative candidate in the second round came from the National Front rather than from the left.

Historic Representation

Election results

2022

 
 
 
 
 
 
 
 
 
|-
| colspan="8" bgcolor="#E9E9E9"|
|-

2017

 
 
 
 
 
 
 
|-
| colspan="8" bgcolor="#E9E9E9"|
|-

2012

 
 
 
 
 
|-
| colspan="8" bgcolor="#E9E9E9"|
|-

2007

 
 
 
 
 
 
 
|-
| colspan="8" bgcolor="#E9E9E9"|
|-

2002

 
 
 
 
|-
| colspan="8" bgcolor="#E9E9E9"|
|-

1997

 
 
 
 
 
 
 
 
|-
| colspan="8" bgcolor="#E9E9E9"|
|-
 
 

 
 
 
 
 

* Socialist dissident

Sources

Official results of French elections from 2002: "Résultats électoraux officiels en France" (in French).

2